Qaleh-ye Hajji Rahmatollah (also Romanized as Qal‘eh-ye Ḩājjī Raḩmatollāh; also known as Qal‘eh-ye Jūjeh Sī, Qal‘eh-ye Jūjeh Sīh, Qal‘eh-ye Raḩmatollāh, and Qal‘eh Jūjeh Sīh) is a village in Zagheh Rural District, Zagheh District, Khorramabad County, Lorestan Province, Iran. At the 2006 census, its population was 76, in 21 families.

References 

Towns and villages in Khorramabad County